Brad Butcher is an Australian country singer-songwriter. As of 2022, Butcher has released four studio albums and has won two golden guitars at the Country Music Awards of Australia.

Career
In 2012, Butched released his self-tilted debut album, which earned him nominations for a range of Australian and international songwriting awards, as well as supports and guest appearances alongside Busby Marou, Bill Chambers, Mark Seymour and Pete Murray. In 2013, Butcher was an APRA Professional Development Award finalist.

In April 2015, Butcher released his second studio album, Jamestown. He began writing for it in 2012 and chose 11 songs from the 50 he'd written. Butcher said "I really feel like this album is my album. I've worked very hard. Everything down to the artistry and where it was produced and mixed was all my decision."

In August 2017, Butcher released his third studio album, From the Bottom of a Well, which was recorded at Sydney's Love Hz Studio. In January 2018, Butcher won Best New Talent at the CMAA for "Well Dressed Man".

In July 2019, Butcher released his fourth studio album, Travelling Salesman. The album, produced by Matt Fell, debuted at number 3 on the ARIA Country Albums chart. Music critic Bernard Zuel said "It's a fourth album with a lot to be proud of".

In December 2021, it was confirmed that Butcher had signed with Ambition Records. He released his first compilation album Storyteller: The Journey So Far in January 2022. The album debuted at number 18 on the ARIA Country Albums chart.

Discography

Studio albums

Compilation albums

Awards and nominations

Country Music Awards of Australia
The Country Music Awards of Australia is an annual awards night held in January during the Tamworth Country Music Festival. Celebrating recording excellence in the Australian country music industry. They commenced in 1973.

! 
|-
|rowspan="3"| 2018 || Brad Butcher ("Well Dressed Man") || New talent of the Year ||  || rowspan="3"|
|-
| Brad Butcher || Male Artist of the Year || 
|-
| From the Bottom of a Well || Alternative Country Album of the Year|| 
|-
|rowspan="3"| 2020 || Brad Butcher || Male Artist of the Year ||  ||rowspan="3"| 
|-
| Travelling Salesman || Alternative Country Album of the Year ||  
|-
| "Freshwater Lady" (Brad Butcher & Vaughan Jones) || Heritage Song of the Year || 
|-

Queensland Music Awards
The Queensland Music Awards (previously known as Q Song Awards) are annual awards celebrating Queensland, Australia's brightest emerging artists and established legends. They commenced in 2006.
 
|-
| 2018
| "Well Dressed Man"
| Country Song of the Year
| 
|-

References

21st-century Australian singers
21st-century Australian male singers
Australian singer-songwriters
Australian male singer-songwriters
Living people
Australian country singers
Musicians from Queensland
Year of birth missing (living people)